Borlée is a surname. Notable people with the surname include:

 (born 1947), former Belgian sprinter and older brother of Jacques 
Jacques Borlée (born 1957), former Belgian sprinter, coach and father of the six athletes in this list
Jonathan Borlée (born 1988), Belgian sprinter and Kevin twin
Kevin Borlée (born 1988), Belgian sprinter and Jonathan twin
Olivia Borlée (born 1986), Belgian sprinter
Alizia Borlée (born 1991), Belgian sprinter
Dylan Borlée (born 1992), Belgian sprinter
Rayane Borlée (born 1999), Belgian sprinter